Eide is a former municipality in the old Aust-Agder county in Norway. It is currently located within the municipality of Grimstad in Agder county. The municipality of Eide existed from 1838 until 1962.  The  municipality included  of land on the mainland and the rest being nearly 70 small islands off the Skaggerak coast. The larger islands include Auseøya, Homborøya, and Ålesøya.  The administrative centre was the village of Eide where the Eide Church is located. Other villages in Eide included Jortveit and Homborsund.

History

The municipality of Eide was created on 1 January 1838 (see formannskapsdistrikt law). During the 1960s, there were many municipal mergers across Norway due to the work of the Schei Committee. On 1 January 1962, the area of Gitmarkgårdene, with 22 inhabitants, was incorporated into the neighboring municipality of Lillesand. The rest of the municipality of Eide, with 504 inhabitants, was merged into the neighboring municipality of Landvik. Later, in 1971, Landvik was incorporated into the municipality of Grimstad.

Name
The municipality (originally the parish) is named after the old Eide farm, since the first Eide Church was built there. The name is identical to the word eid which means "isthmus" because the farm (and church) is located between two bodies of water: the Fosdalskilen and Engekilen.

Government
All municipalities in Norway, including Eide, are responsible for primary education (through 10th grade), outpatient health services, senior citizen services, unemployment and other social services, zoning, economic development, and municipal roads. The municipality was governed by a municipal council of elected representatives, which in turn elected a mayor.

Municipal council
The municipal council  of Eide was made up of 13 representatives that were elected to four year terms.  The party breakdown of the final municipal council was as follows:

Notable residents
Reidar Haave Olsen (1923-1944), a pilot

See also
List of former municipalities of Norway

References

External links

Population data from Statistics Norway

Grimstad
Lillesand
Former municipalities of Norway
1838 establishments in Norway
1962 disestablishments in Norway